The Decentralized Trials & Research Alliance (DTRA) is a non-governmental, 501(c)(3) not-for-profit organization that enables the collaboration of stakeholders to accelerate the adoption of patient-focused, decentralized trials and research within life sciences and healthcare through education and research. DTRA works to make research participation accessible to everyone, enabled by the consistent, widespread adoption of appropriate decentralized research methods.

Launch of DTRA 

Dr. Amir Kalali, M.D., and Craig Lipset are the organization's co-chairs and launched the DTRA on December 10, 2020. They discussed the challenges that decentralized research can address in a piece published in STAT on January 29, 2021, where they confirmed that membership in the organization had reached over 100 collaborating organizations that share the mission of DTRA.

The Importance of Decentralized Research 

Disadvantaged communities have traditionally been largely underrepresented in clinical trials. Decentralized research that leverages available communications, telemedicine, AI, and other technologies have been proposed as a way to help recruit a more broadly representative patient population by gender, ethnicity, age, geography, income, and more. 

in an interview in Clinical Leader, Kalali discussed increasing clinical trial options for diverse patient populations and was quoted as saying "Patients want options, and decentralized methodologies present them with those options. In the future, the average patient will be someone who grew up around the technology and is familiar with using it. If pharma wants to have patients participate in trials, it needs to go where patients want them to be. The younger generation has gotten used to having these technologies in other sectors, and it is how patients will want to interact with trials. The risk for our studies going forward will no longer be whether we can introduce these technologies in our trials. The new risk will be not giving patients new opportunities to engage with trials. This is a real opportunity to create sustained momentum."

MedCity News highlighted decentralized trails as one of the strategies that will make 2021 a "banner year" for life science industries, and cited the DTRA as uniting "industry stakeholders with a singular mission to make clinical trial participation widely accessible by advancing policies, research practices and new technologies in decentralized clinical research."

Impact of COVID-19 

As a result of travel restrictions and the social distancing required to mitigate against the COVID-19 pandemic, clinical trials were impacted worldwide. According to a study published in June of 2020 by researchers at the University of Texas MD Anderson Cancer Center, of the 1052 clinical trials that were suspended during the period from March 1 through April 26, 2020, at least 905 were suspended due to COVID-19.

Experts estimate that the impacts of COVID-19 have set back clinical trial research several years due to prospective patients' reluctance or inability to schedule physical visits at research locations. Decentralized clinical trials have emerged as an answer to that problem, as outlined in a recent report from Oracle Health Sciences.

"The benefits of decentralized research methodologies have been apparent for some time, but adoption has been slow due to many factors including culture and the lack of a forum for stakeholders to collaborate," said Kalali in MobiHealth News in January of 2021. "The COVID-19 pandemic has forced organizations to adopt decentralized methodologies, which have the potential to broadly accelerate drug development."

References

External links
 Official website
Medical and health organizations
501(c)(3) organizations